The Armantie Formation, also rendered A’ermantie, is located in the Xinjiang Uygur Autonomous Region and is dated to the middle Devonian period.

References

Devonian System of Asia
Geology of Inner Mongolia
Geologic formations of China